The year 1824 in archaeology involved some significant events.

Explorations

Excavations
 In Egypt, the tombs at Thebes were excavated (again in 1827-28).
 Near Mexico City, the courtyard of the Great Temple at Tenochtitlan was excavated.
 At Hastings, the interior of the castle was excavated, revealing the chapel, chapter house, etc.

Finds
 At Hastings, when the interior of the castle was excavated, the chapel was discovered, with the chapter house and other offices.
 Slack Roman fort in Yorkshire (England) discovered.
 The Kingittorsuaq Runestone was found in a group of three cairns that formed an equilateral triangle on top of the mountain on a small Kingittorsuaq Island in the south-central part of the Upernavik Archipelago.

Publications
 Jean-François Champollion, Précis du système hiéroglyphique.

Births

 August 2 - Frederick Spurrell

Deaths

See also
Ancient Egypt / Egyptology

Archaeology
Archaeology by year
Archaeology
Archaeology